T-Ray is a supervillain, published by Marvel Comics and created by Joe Kelly and Ed McGuiness. A mercenary for hire, he played an important role in the series Deadpool; T-Ray served to remind Wade Wilson, also known as Deadpool, what a failure he was. He is Deadpool's archenemy for many issues and almost everything that happened to Deadpool was a part of an elaborate plan orchestrated by T-Ray.

Fictional character biography
T-Ray is seen hanging out at the Hellhouse, a place where Deadpool and other mercenaries get their assignments. Deadpool and T-Ray are constantly battling to show who is the bigger man, as well as the better mercenary. During these verbal conflicts, T-Ray typically makes vague threats while Deadpool retorts with 1980s pop-culture references. Several scenes show that T-Ray is a sadistic, remorseless killer; he was the sole mercenary at the Hellhouse willing to take an assignment that involved the killing of children in a gruesome manner. During a scene where T-Ray is meditating naked between the bodies of his victims, several names tattooed on his back are seen, all but one with an "X" through them. The last name not crossed off is "Wilson", Deadpool's real name.

T-Ray and Deadpool come into conflict at the Hellhouse and T-Ray ups the ante by burning off Wade's mask. The insane killer Typhoid Mary is freed by Wade during this time and Wade, inspired by his friend Siryn's attempts to redeem him, tries to redeem Typhoid Mary. He fails and Mary proves that he hasn't become the hero he thinks. Deadpool falls into a deep depression, becoming more aggressive and anti-social. He tries to ask Siryn for help in his own way: by starting a fight with her friend Warpath. Siryn is disgusted with Deadpool's behaviour and leaves, while Deadpool tries to drown his sorrow with alcohol. He wakes up to see Siryn and they spend the night, but when he wakes up it turns out to be Typhoid Mary in disguise.

Returning home, Deadpool tries to find support with his friends Blind Al and Weasel, but he's unable to find Weasel at the Hellhouse. T-Ray appears and challenges Deadpool for a fight. Returning home Deadpool finds Weasel and Blind Al (It is important to know that Deadpool at this time had various mental disorders. One of them was that he didn't allow anybody else in his home except for Blind Al, whom he kept completely isolated from the outside world. Any hint of intruders and he would fly into a murderous rage.) Deadpool turns on the two and leaves them locked up in the Box: a dark room filled with sharp objects. He then returns for the fight with T-Ray, but recent events have destroyed Deadpool's tenuous grip on his sanity and T-Ray, revealing his formidable magical abilities, defeats him with ease. Even a counterattack by Deadpool which pierces T-Ray's heart is unable to kill him. T-Ray merely responds: "I haven't had a heart for a long time... Not since you tore mine out." T-Ray leaves Deadpool, broken both in body and spirit. He meets up with Typhoid Mary, who had been working with T-Ray all the time. He returns to the Hellhouse and proclaims himself the new top dog.

Over the next few months, Deadpool rebuilds his confidence and sanity, but shortly afterwards he starts to have hallucinations of a woman. He finally finds out her identity after some unorthodox treatment by Doctor Bong that she is Mercedes Wilson, his thought-deceased wife. Deadpool meets up with Mercedes in Georgia. T-Ray returns, crucifies one of Deadpool's friends on the Hellhouse front steps and kidnaps Mercedes. He issues a challenge to Deadpool and Deadpool accepts. During their confrontation T-Ray claims that Deadpool is not Wade Wilson at all: T-Ray is the real Wade Wilson.

T-Ray tells the story of Wade and Mercedes Wilson, a teacher and his wife living a happy life until a wounded mercenary called Jack shows up. Jack is nursed back to health by the Wilsons, but turns on them, killing Mercedes and taking Wade's identity to hide from his previous employers. Jack has become a broken man though; he could deal with killing Wade, but killing Mercedes is too much for his mind to handle and he starts to believe that he really is Wade Wilson. He also starts to train to avenge Mercedes and becomes Deadpool. Meanwhile, Jack's former employers find the real Wade Wilson and offer to heal him and train him in exchange for his service as a mercenary. Wilson gets into voodoo and magic and becomes T-Ray. Furthermore, T-Ray brings back all the people Wade has ever killed from the dead (like he had with Mercedes), which measures in the thousands, to show Wade just how awful of a life he has led. Here ends T-Ray's story.

Deadpool believes the story and nearly loses his mind, but then he starts laughing: it doesn't matter who he is or what he's done in the past, because he's now trying to be a better person. In return T-Ray has become consumed with hatred and has become even worse than Deadpool ever was: he resurrected his dead wife, using her as just a tool to punish the man who killed her. Mercedes hears the story and powers up Deadpool with her magic, allowing Deadpool to defeat T-Ray. Deadpool apologizes to Mercedes, and asks if there are any hard feelings. Mercedes says there are, and kicks him in the junk. T-Ray gets up, and with Mercedes by his side, goes off to parts unknown saying that Deadpool can keep the name Wade now; he's done with it and doesn't want anything to do with Deadpool anymore.

Months later, T-Ray, now an agent of Thanos resurrects Deadpool, who has been killed in a fight with Weapon X, using an artifact Thanos gave him to create many copies of Deadpool. Thanos is jealous of Deadpool's relationship with Death and T-Ray is to "curse him with immortality" so that he may never see Death again. In the end, Deadpool destroys the artifact and all the copies, but not the real Deadpool, are drawn into T-Ray, destroying his mind. Deadpool claims that this means he was the real Wade Wilson all along. The mindless T-Ray is taken by one of Deadpool's new, homeless friends as a 'lover' (he lacks the mental capacity to agree or disagree with this).

T-Ray returns in the pages of Cable & Deadpool, kidnapping his friends and once again laying claim to the identity of Wade Wilson.

However, after having his mental fluctuations cured by Cable several issues previously, Deadpool claimed that his memories of the event were now much more clear. He pointed out several holes in T-Ray's claims, including the fact that in his flashback he depicted "Jack" as wearing Deadpool's costume even though Deadpool did not exist yet. He also recalled that he had registered in the military under the name "Wade Winston Wilson" years before ever encountering T-Ray. However, he also acknowledged that the truth may never really be known, as both he and T-Ray are insane, and neither is truly reliable.

This encounter between them was evidently intended to lampoon the ongoing debate among fans, who have raised many of the same arguments to support their views of who is the true Wilson. The fight ends with Deadpool stabbing T-Ray in the head with his sword, apparently killing him. However, the body magically vanishes soon afterward, making it seem that T-Ray survived.

In this story T-Ray also possessed Deadpool's "Fourth Wall Awareness", making blatant mention of the readers, Deadpool's narration captions, and the sound effects used during their fight. On the recap page, he claimed that this is further evidence of his identity: who else but Wade Wilson behaves in this manner?

In Cable & Deadpool #47 T-Ray's body returns. It seems that the head wound he sustained in his fight with Deadpool was leaking mystical energies, damaging the fabric of several universes in the process. Master of the Mystic Arts Doctor Strange contacts Agency X to hire Deadpool to fix the mess he inadvertently created. Deadpool and his erstwhile sidekick Bob, Agent of HYDRA are sent throughout the various planes T-Ray made contact with to collect life force from the denizens there. Much to Deadpool's chagrin, he learns that he must use this power to resurrect T-Ray. Grudgingly he does so and T-Ray's corpse vanishes, seeking his soul while Deadpool and Bob are transported to Louisiana and encounter Brother Voodoo.

Brother Voodoo sent Deadpool into T-Ray's soul to convince him to come back to life, which he resisted. At first T-Ray seemed the obvious victor, owing to the possibility that Deadpool did not have a soul of his own. However, Deadpool discovered that he did indeed possess one when he was able to use it to split into dozens of heroic Deadpools who resembled other Marvel heroes and represented his potential for greatness. T-Ray was defeated and came back to life where he learned that he was now bound to serve as a guardian of the Mystic Realms he had breached. Although they still claimed to despise each other, Deadpool and T-Ray peacefully went their separate ways.

T-Ray and Slayback are later hired by Allison Kemp to help her assassinate Deadpool. During their battle, T-Ray attempts to kill Deadpool with his own bomb, but instead accidentally blows himself up as Deadpool reveals that the bomb was a decoy, and that the real one was the "detonator" that he had allowed T-Ray to grab.

Wade Wilson or not?
The main point of T-Ray's story depends on T-Ray really being the true Wade Wilson, but since then many comics have changed Deadpool's history and Deadpool's many mental disorders obscure the truth even more.
Evidence that Deadpool is the true Wade Wilson:
In Cable & Deadpool issue #36, General Hartecourt tells Weasel when being forced to observe Deadpool, "But you know I've hated Wilson since I was his Drill Sergeant..." This is someone who apparently knew him historically before he went to Weapon-X and became Deadpool, lending further credence to Deadpool being the real Wade Wilson.
Deadpool has dreams about being the Wilsons and in his memory "Jack" is a large albino; T-Ray.
Deadpool's claim after destroying T-Ray's artifact.
The letters page of Cable and Deadpool #30 suggested that Wade Wilson was Deadpool's real name - however, the Cable and Deadpool letters page answers are written "in-character" as Deadpool, and so this should not be trusted. T-Ray returns in #38 of said series, now angry that both Deadpool and Agent X have "his" identity.
After their battle in issue 39, Deadpool recalls having viewed T-Ray's memories, where Jack was seen to be wearing the Deadpool costume. Deadpool insists that he never wore the suit until after he left Weapon X, having been disfigured by their treatment and hiding his face under the mask. This is taken from the mixed perspectives of both of the madmen, but this appears to be one of the few things Deadpool seems certain of. These memories do not depict Jack wearing a mask of any sort, only a bodysuit similar to what Deadpool presently wears.
Most of the alternate reality versions of Deadpool go by some form of the name "Wade Wilson".
Tombstone had one of his scientists create a serum that nullifies Deadpool's healing factor from a strand of Deadpool's hair obtained from his baby book. It would stand that the baby book found would be Wade Wilson's.
Evidence that T-Ray is the true Wade Wilson:
When Deadpool tells Montgomery he is married, he replies that he has been stalking him for years and knew everything from his birth to his death and never heard of Mercedes.
Mercedes does not dispute any of T-Ray's story about the early stages of her relationship with Wade Wilson — their meeting in university, their marriage and honeymoon, their relationship with her parents, etc. Deadpool himself does not dispute the fateful events that took place in Maine — the Wilsons taking in an injured mercenary who eventually kills Mercedes and leaves Wade for dead — he only disputes who played what role. If Deadpool was indeed Wade Wilson in the story and not 'Jack', this would mean that Deadpool was once a happily married, college educated pacifist, a stark contrast to any other comic book depiction of his early life.
Deadpool does not remember any of the personal details of his life with Mercedes prior to the incident with 'Jack.' T-Ray claims that it isn't that Deadpool doesn't remember this past, he simply doesn't know it, unlike T-Ray and Mercedes.
Deadpool's claim after destroying T-Ray's artifact that this proves he is the true Wade Wilson could mean that he just was not one of the copies T-Ray created during that story. This has puzzled fans who have found no logical reason that the disappearance of the copies would in any way prove or disprove T-Ray's story. It is possible that the fact that they were absorbed back into T-Ray showed they were fragments of his shattered personality, not those of Deadpool's.
The recent Official Handbook of the Marvel Universe has stated that Deadpool's true name is "Jack".
 "Deadpool Saga", the featurette in Deadpool #1 (2008), states nothing about the Jack identity, but describes the young Deadpool as a nameless soldier of fortune, wanting to steal Mercedes' love and Wade Wilson identity, and later describes T-Ray as the real Wade returned to life. According to the featurette a still benignly deranged Deadpool lost his mind after killing Mercedes, thus believing him to be Wade as a coping mechanism.

Powers and abilities
T-Ray has all the characteristics of a (fictional) zombie: he has pale skin, incredible strength, a truly monumental stench (according to Deadpool), and even serious injuries don't slow him down, though he does retain his own free will and full intelligence. After having a hole knocked through him in Deadpool #32 it is revealed that he has dirt inside of him instead of organs. This backs up his claim that he doesn't have a heart.

He has extensive knowledge of magic, especially voodoo rituals, that allow him to raise the dead.

As a servant of Thanos, he possessed an artifact which could take aspects of Deadpool's personality and give them independent existence.

References

External links

Characters created by Joe Kelly
Comics characters introduced in 1997
Fictional mercenaries in comics
Marvel Comics undead characters
Marvel Comics characters who use magic
Marvel Comics characters with superhuman strength
Zombies in comics
Deadpool characters